Passengers is a 1984 song by English musician Elton John that appears on his 1984 album Breaking Hearts, released as the second single of the album. The song reached number five on the UK chart, and reached the top ten in Australia, but was not released as a single in the US.

The song was included on his 1990 UK release The Very Best of Elton John, but has not been included on any compilation since.

Background
It was composed by John, Bernie Taupin and Davey Johnstone. The music for the song was largely based on a South African folk tune called 'Isonto Lezayone', which was recorded in 1963 by Phineas Mkhize. The whistle riff and chorus melody are borrowed from this piece, and Mkhize is given a songwriting credit for the song on this basis. 'Passengers' had the most co-writers for an original Elton John song at that point, only to be out-done by John's "Wrap Her Up" from the following year. It has been suggested that Taupin's lyric has an anti-apartheid message behind it.

Live performances
John performed the song live during his 1985 tour of the UK, with a slightly re-arranged version of the track, making use of the brass section he used for the tour. The song has seemingly been discarded by John, having not been played live since then, as of 2019.

Music video
The music video, directed by Simon Milne, was filmed in St. Tropez, France. The video featured a cameo appearance by Bernie Taupin. As was the case for many of the songs in this time period, John appears without his trademark glasses, and does not play piano.

Personnel 
 Elton John – vocals, synthesizers, harmonium
 Davey Johnstone – acoustic guitar, backing vocals
 Dee Murray – bass, backing vocals
 Nigel Olsson – drums, backing vocals

Charts

Weekly charts

Year-end charts

References

Elton John songs
1984 songs
1984 singles
Songs with music by Elton John
Songs with lyrics by Bernie Taupin
Song recordings produced by Chris Thomas (record producer)